This is a list of fellows of the Royal Society elected in 1688.

Fellows 
Joannes Nicolaus Pechlin  (1646–1706)
Edward Stillingfleet  (1660–1708)
Raymond Vieussens  (1635–1715)
John Adair  (1647–1718)
Sir Charles Gresham  (1660–1718)
John Clayton  (1657–1725)
Joannes Adamus Stampfer  (d. 1743)
Nicolas Fatio de Duillier  (1664–1753)

References

1688
1688 in science
1688 in England